His Highness Sheikh Abu Salman Sabah I bin Jaber Al Sabah (c. 1700–1762) was the first ruler of the Sheikhdom of Kuwait. He was chosen by his community for the position of sheikh.

Reign of Sabah bin Jaber
The families of the Bani Utbah finally arrived in Kuwait in 1713 AD and settled after receiving permission from the Emir of al-Hasa Sa'dun bin Muhammad who ruled from 1691–1722 AD. In 1718, the head of each family in the town of Kuwait gathered and chose Sabah I bin Jaber as the Sheikh of Kuwait, becoming a governor of sorts underneath the Emir of Al Hasa.

In 1752, Kuwait became independent after an agreement between the Sheikh of Kuwait and the Emir of Al Hasa in which Al Hasa recognised Sabah I bin Jaber's independent rule over Kuwait and in exchange Kuwait would not ally itself or support the enemies of Al Hasa or interfere in the internal affairs of Al Hasa in any way. Upon his death, Sabah I was succeeded by his youngest son, Abdullah bin Sabah.

See also
List of emirs of Kuwait
Flag of Kuwait

References

Year of birth uncertain
18th-century deaths
18th-century people from the Ottoman Empire
18th-century Kuwaiti people
Rulers of Kuwait
House of Al-Sabah
Arabs from the Ottoman Empire
18th-century Arabs
18th-century rulers in Asia
History of Kuwait